Le Lycée Français de Los Angeles (French School of Los Angeles) is a private bilingual education school founded in 1964.

School
 the school had more than 1,075 students, about 50%–60% of them being French citizens and the remainder Americans or coming from over 54 nations.

It is composed of the following campuses:

Campus 55 (Preschool and K1)
Century City Campus (K2 and 1st Grade) 
Pacific Palisades Campus (Preschool through Grade 2)
Overland Campus (Grade 2 through 8)
The Raymond & Esther Kabbaz High School (Grade 9 through 12)

Former campuses 
In 1980 the Lycee bought the  former Parkway School property, located in the Hollywood Riviera section of Torrance, from the Torrance Unified School District. This property became the Lycee's Torrance campus, and as of February 1990 the campus had 100 students. In November 1989, the Lycee sold the property.

Notable alumni
Leslie Bega, actress
Mika Boorem, actress
Christie Brinkley, model
Jodie Foster, actress
Noah Hathaway, actor
Claire Danes, actress
Tania Raymonde, actress
Kelli Williams, actress
Molly Ringwald, actress
 Michael Vartan, actor

See also
Agence pour l'enseignement français à l'étranger
 American School of Paris - An American international school in France

References

Further reading
 "Le Lycée Francais de Los Angeles" (Archive).
  Marie-Amélie Fauchier-Magnan. "Un nouveau campus pour le Lycée Français de Los Angeles" (Archive). France-Amérique. 14 September 2009.

External links
Official website
Official website (Archive)
Raymond Kabbaz Theatre (Théâtre Raymond Kabbaz)

Schools in Los Angeles
French international schools in the United States
International schools in California
 
Private K-12 schools in Los Angeles County, California
Bilingual schools in the United States
High schools in Los Angeles
AEFE accredited schools
French-American culture in California
Century City, Los Angeles
Palms, Los Angeles
Rancho Park, Los Angeles
Pacific Palisades, Los Angeles

Woodland Hills, Los Angeles
Torrance, California
Educational institutions established in 1964
1964 establishments in California